The premier of the Northwest Territories is a title given to the head of government in the Northwest Territories of Canada when the territory is using an elected system of responsible government. Throughout its history, the territory has been governed by various combinations of locally elected governments and administrators appointed by the government of Canada.

Upon creation, the Northwest Territories were governed by the lieutenant governor of Manitoba, a representative of the federal government and Queen Victoria, for the newly created province of Manitoba. Six years later in 1876, the territory was given its own lieutenant governor, separate from that of Manitoba. These lieutenant governors presided over an assembly with members both elected and appointed by the federal government. When this quota was met, a by-election was held to elect a member to replace an appointed one.

The Northwest Territories held its first general elections to the North-West Legislative Assembly in 1888 when it considered the population to be sufficient. After this election, the chairman of the assembly's Executive Committee (analogous to a cabinet) assumed the role of head of government. From 1897 to 1905, the chairman used the title "premier", the same title used by the heads of government in the Canadian provinces.

In 1905, the provinces of Saskatchewan and Alberta were created from the most populous regions of the Northwest Territories. With a much lower population, powers of the territory's head of government reverted to a federal and Crown representative appointed by the prime minister of Canada, this time with the title . Beginning in 1951, and increasingly in 1967, powers were transferred back to an elected assembly. In 1980, the head of this assembly regained the title of premier, and in 1985 the became chair of the Executive Council and full head of government.

Because the Northwest Territories has a consensus government, the premier is elected by, and from, the members of the Legislative Assembly, and are not divided into parties. This list contains only those government leaders who governed under an elected system of responsible government. For the heads of government before and in between these times, see commissioner of the Northwest Territories.

Premiers of the Northwest Territories

|-
|colspan="10"|Chairman of the Lt. Governor's Advisory Council

|-
|colspan="10"|Chairman of the Executive Committee

|-
|colspan="10"|Premiers of the Northwest Territories

|-
|colspan="10"|See commissioner of the Northwest Territories for the heads of government between 1905 and 1980.

See also
 List of Northwest Territories general elections
 List of lieutenant governors of the Northwest Territories

References
General

  
 

Specific

External links
 Premier of the Northwest Territories

Northwest Territories

Lists of people from the Northwest Territories